Alexandru Constantin Olteanu (born 5 April 2000) is a Romanian professional footballer who plays as a defender for CS Universitatea Craiova.

Honours

Universitatea Craiova
Cupa României: 2020–21
Supercupa României: 2021

References

External links
 
 Alexandru Olteanu at footballdatabase.eu

2000 births
Living people
Sportspeople from Craiova
Romanian footballers
Association football defenders
FC Emmen players
SV Meppen players
Liga I players
CS Universitatea Craiova players
Romanian expatriate footballers
Romanian expatriate sportspeople in the Netherlands
Expatriate footballers in the Netherlands
Romanian expatriate sportspeople in Germany
Expatriate footballers in Germany
Asser Christelijke Voetbalvereniging players